Robin Haase and Matwé Middelkoop defeated Lloyd Harris and Tim Pütz in the final, 4–6, 7–6(7–5), [10–5], to win the doubles tennis title at the 2022 ABN AMRO Rotterdam. It was their fourth career ATP Tour doubles title as a team and marked Haase's seventh individual doubles title and Middelkoop's 12th. Harris and Pütz were competing in their first event together.

Nikola Mektić and Mate Pavić were the defending champions, but lost in the first round to Haase and Middelkoop.

Seeds

Draw

Draw

Qualifying

Seeds

Qualifiers 
  Jesper de Jong /  Sem Verbeek

Qualifying draw

References

External links
 Main draw
 Qualifying draw

2022 ATP Tour